Serbia has submitted films for the Academy Award for Best International Feature Film under three different names since the breakup of Yugoslavia in the early 1990s. Despite the name changes, all submitted films since 1994 have been Serbian productions.

The Foreign Film Award is handed out annually by the United States Academy of Motion Picture Arts and Sciences to a feature-length motion picture produced outside the United States that contains primarily non-English dialogue.

, 28 Serbian films have been submitted for the Academy Award for Best Foreign Language Film, but none of them have been accepted as nominees. In January 2008, it was announced that the acclaimed Serbian thriller The Trap had made the nine-film Oscar shortlist but it ultimately failed to make the final five. Furthermore, six films representing Yugoslavia received Oscar nominations between 1959 and 1992, most or all of which had significant Serbian input.

Submissions
The Academy of Motion Picture Arts and Sciences has invited the film industries of various countries to submit their best film for the Academy Award for Best Foreign Language Film since 1956. The Foreign Language Film Award Committee oversees the process and reviews all the submitted films. Following this, they vote via secret ballot to determine the five nominees for the award. Below is a list of the films that have been submitted by Serbia and its predecessor states for review by the Academy for the award by year and the respective Academy Awards ceremony.

See also
 List of Kosovan submissions for the Academy Award for Best International Feature Film
 List of Montenegrin submissions for the Academy Award for Best International Feature Film
List of Yugoslav submissions for the Academy Award for Best International Feature Film
List of Academy Award winners and nominees for Best Foreign Language Film
List of Academy Award-winning foreign language films
Cinema of Serbia

Notes

References

External links
The Official Academy Awards Database
The Motion Picture Credits Database
IMDb Academy Awards Page

Serbia
Academy